Now... Us! is the second studio album by German girl group No Angels. It was released by Polydor–Zeitgeist and Cheyenne Records on June 24, 2002, in German-speaking Europe. Recorded after the release of the band's majorly successful debut album Elle'ments (2001) and its accompanying Rivers of Joy Tour, the group consulted work by frequent collaborators Thorsten Brötzmann, Peter Ries, and Leslie Mándoki as well as international songwriters and producers such as Anders Bagge, Figge Boström, Dennis Dowlut, Mousse T., Pontus Söderqvist, and Quiz & Larossi, while taking a wider role in contributing own lyrics and melodies to the album.

Upon its release, Now... Us! received a mixed reception from music critics, many of whom praised band for their vocal performances and the inclusion of self-penned solo songs but found the material too generic and cliché-addled. Commercially, it became No Angels's second album to debut atop the German Albums Chart and was eventually certified double platinum by the Bundesverband Musikindustrie (BVMI), finishing twelfth on the national year-end chart in 2002. Now... Us! also opened at number two and number four in Austria and Switzerland, where it reached gold status respectively.

The album spawned three singles, including the band's third non-consecutive number-one "Something About Us", summer-lite "Still in Love with You" and funk-influenced "Let's Go to Bed", A pop version of its fourth single, the Alison Moyet cover "All Cried Out", appeared on a Special Winter Edition reissue of the album, released in November 2002. To promote Now... Us!, No Angels embarked on the Four Seasons Tour, covering Austria, Germany, and Switzerland, in fall 2002. It would remain the group's final album as a quintet after Jessica Wahls's departure in 2003 and their reformation as a quartet in 2007.

Background
In 2000, No Angels beat 4,500 other hopefuls in the German version of the RTL II talent show Popstars. Recruited to join a girl pop band, the quintet signed a recording deal with Polydor–Zeitgeist and Cheyenne Records and became overnight hits, with their debut single "Daylight in Your Eyes" emerging as the biggest-selling single of the year 2001 in Germany. For the production of their English language parent album, Cheyenne consulted a small group of German-based musicians to work on Elle'ments, including Thorsten Brötzmann, Peter Ries, Leslie Mándoki, and Peter Plate. Selecting songs from the Universal Music Publishing Group catalogue, the producers would either take over production duties from Scandinavian musicians or submit self-written songs for recording.

A pop record with different genres such as Europop, teen pop, electro, and dance, Elle'ments combined elements from pop rock, drum and bass, and contemporary R&B, but while it became one of the fastest-selling German albums in music history, No Angels still struggled with the clichés and prejudices generally associated with their manufactured band image, which made them appear as externally controlled reality TV products rather than ambitious artists. Frustrated by both the public perception and the group's A&R-dominated musical development, band member Vanessa Petruo asked for a release from her contract after her first year with the band, but had her mind changed when Cheyenne Records decided on supporting her wish for more creative control and thus offered the band to contribute own songs to their next album.

Production 
In February 2002, after a short break from public, No Angels began work on their second album in Munich and Hamburg. Complying their wishes to take a bigger in the production of their sophomore effort, Cheyenne Records arranged for them to reteam with Thorsten Brötzmann, Peter Ries, and Leslie Mándoki, all of whom had contributed to their debut album Elle'ments, to work on new songs. Brötzmann and his co-producer Joachim "Jeo" Mezei oversaw production on the Anders Bagge-penned R&B song "Lovestory" as well as "Now That We Found Love", one of five solo songs on the album. Lead sung by band member Vanessa Petruo, it chronicles a woman's desire to love-making with her new lover. Petruo also collaborated with the duo and songwriter Alex Geringas on the uptempo song "Something About Us" which blends contemporary R&B and dance-pop with soft Latin-pop and was conceived as response to what the band felt was intense and sometimes unfair and inaccurate media criticism at the time, predominantly resulting from the clichés and prejudices generally associated with their manufactured band image.

Ries produced "Three Words", a Quiz & Larossi-written rock pop-tinged track that was later included on the album's reissue, and worked with Sandy Mölling on her solo song "Say Goodbye", an R&B-flavored uptempo song which she co-wrote over a demo track by British singer Celetia Martin. Mándoki contributed the uplifting mid-tempo track "Push Me to the Limit" and worked with Wahls on her solo song "Shield Against My Sorrow", a downtempo ode to a loved one. "Atlantis", his production of No Angels's cover version of the same-titled 1968 song, which the band had re-recorded with original singer Donovan for the closing credits of the Walt Disney Feature Animation picture Atlantis: The Lost Empire (2001), was also included on the track listing. Lucy Diakovska collaborated with producers Oliver Fahrenheit and Christian Kelvin on her solo song "Stay", a piano-driven ballad on which she demands her lover to stay for another night with her;  while Nadja Benaissa teamed with Daniel Troha on "Come Back", another piano ballad that has her asking for a loved one to return.

Apart from their previous collaborators, Polydor also consulted Mousse T and frequent collaborators Oliver Dommaschk and Marco Quast from production duo Royal Garden Sound to work with the band. Known for his mixture of the house and funk genres, Mousse reteamed with Errol Rennalls, his co-writer on the hit singles "Horny '98" (1998) and "Sex Bomb" (2000), on "Let's Go to Bed", a mid-paced pop song that contains heavy elements of psychedelic soul and references to a celebration of sexual lust and conquest. Dommaschk and Quast contributed album opener "Anchor Your Love" a beat- and guitar-heavy uptempo pop song which they co-wrote with Kaidy-Ann Morgan and that has the protagonist wondering about how she can retains a man's love. Swedish producers Pontus Söderqvist and Nick Nice from songwriting collective LaCarr produced "Still in Love with You", a Latin pop ballad which has the female protagonist thinking deeply over her relationship with her love interest from whom she parted, and "Autumn Breeze", penned by the Australian band Disco Montego, consisting of the Dowlut brothers Dennis and Darren.

Release and reception 

Media reception for Now... Us! was generally mixed. Although most professional reviewers praised the band for the inclusion of self-written material and a "less conventional" and more mature pop sound with "major influences of contemporary R&B and soul," laut.de editor Joachim Gauger declared the album as "teen-pop" on "average level", He felt that the self-composed lyrics "always seem wooden and clichéd and don't really touch the listener," but complimented the other songs on Now... Us! which he considered at the level of American pop productions. Matthias Eisen from CDStarts cited the album "dissembling [...] cheesy and clichéd," sharply criticizing the cover songs on Now... Us!. MusikWoche found that the album was "clearly superior to the songs of their debut album. With Now ... Us!, No Angels take a promising first step on the way to the seriously increasing pop act, which still has a lot to expect for the girls' future careers."

Upon its release, Now... Us! became the band's second consecutive studio album to top the German Albums Chart, while also reaching number two and number four on the Austrian and Swiss Albums Charts, respectively. After spending 33 weeks inside the Offizielle Top 100, it was ranked twelfth on the German year-end chart and awarded double platinum by the Bundesverband Musikindustrie (BVMI). Although "2 Get Over U" was planned to be released a special Christmas single with UK popstars Hear'Say at times, it was eventually shelved following the moderate success of their single "Pure and Simple" (2001) throughout German-speaking Europe. It was replaced by lead single "Something about Us" and its B-side "Like Ice in the Sunshine." "Something about Us" became the band's third non-consecutive number-one hit on the German and Austrian Singles Chart within a period of 16 months, and reached a peak position of 11 on the Swiss Singles Chart. Second single, "Still in Love with You", reached the top 5 in Germany and Austria. Third single "Let's Go to Bed" ended the run of No Angels' consecutive top ten songs in Germany, and failed to chart on the Swiss Hitparade. A previously unreleased fourth single, the Alison Moyet cover "All Cried Out" was included on the November 2002 released Special Winter Edition reissue of the album.

Track listing 
Credits adapted from the liner notes of Now... Us!.

Notes
  denotes co-producer

Credits and personnel 

 Curly Ausmer – guitar
 Thorsten Brötzmann – keyboards, guitar
 Laszlo Benker – various
 Sven Bünger – acoustic guitar
 Julian Feifel – various
 Thorsten Fuchs – guitar
 Stravos Iannou – acoustic guitar
 B. La – percussion
 Fan Fan La Tulip – guitar
 Sami Khatib – various
 Michael Knauer – keyboards

 George Kopecsni – various
 Peter Koobs – guitar
 Johan Lindman – guitar
 S.L.O. Warschau – strings
 Ossi Schalle – various
 Ingo Schröder – rhythm guitar
 Berni Schwarz – various
 Daniel Throa – keyboard, percussion, guitar
 Peter Weihe – guitar
 Peter Wölpl – various
 Stephan Zeh – various

Production 
 Vocal assistance: James Caldwell, Linda Freeland, Inez Haynes, Franca Morgano, Daniel Troha
 Engineers: Felix Knöchel, Spok, Mike Streefkerk, Stephan Zeh
 Mixing: Peter Boström, Jeo, Pit Floss, Nike Nice, Mike Streefkerk, Stephan Zeh
 Artwork: Ronald Rensberg, Berlin
 Photography: Benjamin Wolf, Sven Jacobsen

Leftover tracks 
 "Three Words" (written by Peter Ries) (appears as a B-side on the "Still in Love with You" single)
 "Since I Found You" (written by Vanessa Petruo, Thorsten Brötzmann, Alexander Geringas) (appeared on the Four Seasons Tour setlist)

Charts

Weekly charts

Year-end charts

Sales and certifications

Release history

References

External links 
 NoAngels-Music.de — official site 

No Angels albums
2002 albums
Polydor Records albums